The 2011–12 Sheffield Shield season is the 110th season of the Sheffield Shield, the domestic first-class cricket competition of Australia. The season began on 11 October 2011, with Queensland playing Victoria, and concluded on 19 March 2012 with the top two teams playing off in the final.

Teams

  New South Wales will also host one match at Bankstown Oval in Sydney and Manuka Oval in Canberra.

Table

The top two teams after the conclusion of the regular season competed in the Sheffield Shield final. Due to finishing first on the points table, Queensland won the right to host the final at their home ground, The Gabba. For an explanation of how points are awarded, see Sheffield Shield points system.

Updated to completion of season.

Fixtures and results
Correct as of 21 March 2012. Source

October

November

December

January
No Sheffield Shield matches were played in January due to the 2011–12 Big Bash League season.

February

March

The Final

Statistics

Most runs

Last updated 20 March 2012

Highest scores

Last updated 20 March 2012

Most wickets

Last updated 20 March 2012

Best bowling

Last updated 20 March 2012

See also
 2011–12 Ryobi One-Day Cup
 2011–12 Big Bash League season

References

Sheffield Shield
Sheffield Shield
Sheffield Shield seasons